Petros Dimitriadis (born 21 January 1978) is a retired Greek football striker.

References

1978 births
Living people
Greek footballers
Xanthi F.C. players
Digenis Akritas Morphou FC players
Panionios F.C. players
Levadiakos F.C. players
AEP Paphos FC players
Makedonikos F.C. players
Korinthos F.C. players
Panegialios F.C. players
Asteras Magoula F.C. players
Kalamata F.C. players
Super League Greece players
Association football forwards
Greek expatriate footballers
Expatriate footballers in Cyprus
Greek expatriate sportspeople in Cyprus
Cypriot First Division players
Footballers from Edessa, Greece